Pla del Remei is a ward (barrio) of Valencia, Spain, belonging to the district of Eixample.

Geography of Valencia